Polan may refer to:

Polán, a municipality in the province of Toledo, Castile-La Mancha, Spain
Polan (surname)
Polan, Iran, a village in Sistan and Baluchestan Province, Iran
Polan District, a district in Chah Bahar County, Sistan and Baluchestan Province, Iran
Polan Rural District, a rural district in Sistan and Baluchestan Province, Iran

See also
Polans (disambiguation)
Pollan (disambiguation)
Polian (disambiguation)
Poland (disambiguation)